Raymond Thiry (born 29 September 1959) is a Dutch actor. He has appeared in more than eighty films since 1994.

Filmography

Prizes 
 2015 - ShortCutz Amsterdam Annual Award, Best Actor for A MAN FALLS FROM THE SKY

External links

References 

1959 births
Living people
Dutch male film actors
Dutch male actors
20th-century Dutch male actors
21st-century Dutch male actors